GDP-mannose:cellobiosyl-diphosphopolyprenol alpha-mannosyltransferase (GumH, AceA, alpha1,3-mannosyltransferase AceA) is an enzyme with systematic name GDP-mannose:D-Glc-beta-(1->4)-Glc-alpha-1-diphospho-ditrans,octacis-undecaprenol 3-alpha-mannosyltransferase . This enzyme catalyses the following chemical reaction

 GDP-mannose + D-Glc-beta-(1->4)-Glc-alpha-1-diphospho-ditrans,octacis-undecaprenol  GDP + D-Man-alpha-(1->3)-D-Glc-beta-(1->4)-D-Glc-alpha-1-diphospho-ditrans,octacis-undecaprenol

In the bacterium Gluconacetobacter xylinus the enzyme is involved in the biosynthesis of the exopolysaccharide acetan.

References

External links 
 

EC 2.4.1